Joseph or Joe Brody may refer to:

Joseph Brody (1877–1937), American composer who taught George Gershwin composition
Joe Brody, fictional character in the novel The Big Sleep and in its film adaptations
Joe Brody, fictional character in Godzilla (2014 film)
Joe Brody, character in Lunarcop played by Michael Paré

See also
Joe Brodie, drummer in Drowners
Brody (disambiguation)
Joseph Brady (disambiguation)